Shamsail Saraliev (November 5, 1973, Grozny) is a Russian  political figure and deputy of the 8th State Duma. 

From 1996 to 2002, Saraliev worked at the joint-stock bank "Exnet" (Grozny branch). In August 2002, he became the consultant to the deputy head of the administration of the Chechen Republic, but already in September, he was appointed acting head of the press service of the head of the Chechen Republic administration. In 2003, Saraliev headed press services of Akhmad Kadyrov. In 2007, he was the adviser to Ramzan Kadyrov. In 2011, he was appointed Minister of the Chechen Republic for External Relations, National Policy, Press and Information. The same year, Saraliev was elected deputy of the 6th State Duma. In 2016 and 2021, he was re-elected for the 7th and 8th State Dumas from the Chechen Republic constituency.

On 24 March 2022, the United States Treasury sanctioned him in response to the 2022 Russian invasion of Ukraine.

References

1973 births
Living people
United Russia politicians
21st-century Russian politicians
Eighth convocation members of the State Duma (Russian Federation)
Seventh convocation members of the State Duma (Russian Federation)
Sixth convocation members of the State Duma (Russian Federation)
Russian individuals subject to the U.S. Department of the Treasury sanctions